Emily Grace Creswell (born 1 June 1889 –1974) was a British artist, known for painting portraits and miniatures.

Biography
Creswell was born at Ravenstone in Leicestershire and attended University College, Reading before studying at a succession of art schools in Leicester, Harrogate and Leamington Spa. She also took lessons from the miniature painter Arthur Lindsay in London. Creswell exhibited with the Royal Birmingham Society of Artists, the Royal Miniature Society, the Royal Institute of Painters in Water Colours, the Society of Women Artists and elsewhere in England. She lived for most of her life in Leamington Spa and later at Harrogate.

References

1889 births
1974 deaths
20th-century English painters
20th-century English women artists
Alumni of De Montfort University
Alumni of the University of Reading
English women painters
People from Leicestershire